Snake Woman may refer to:

Snake Woman, sister of Chief Niwot and mother of Margaret Poisal
Cihuacoatl, literally "Snake Woman", an Aztec goddess

Film and literature
A snake-woman hybrid in mythology or fiction; see List of reptilian humanoids
Snake Woman (comics), a Virgin Comics comic book title and character
The Snake Woman, a 1961 British horror film
Snakewoman, a 2005 film directed by Jesús Franco
 Hebi Onna ("Snake Woman"), manga series by Kazuo Umezu published in English as Reptilia

See also
Snake man (disambiguation)